Aftermathematics (styled AFTERMATHematics) is a collaborative album by Grand Mixer DXT and Bill Laswell, released on December 5, 2003 by Sub Rosa.

Track listing

Personnel 
Adapted from the Aftermathematics liner notes.
Musicians
Sly Dunbar – drums (4)
Skiz Fernando – drum programming (3, 7, 9, 10)
Grand Mixer DXT – turntables, keyboards, percussion, effects
Bill Laswell – instruments, musical arrangements, producer
Robert Musso – drum programming (1, 2, 5, 6, 8), engineering
Technical personnel
John Brown – cover art, design
James Dellatacoma – assistant engineer, guitar (5, 8)
Michael Fossenkemper – mastering

Release history

References

External links 
 

2003 albums
Collaborative albums
Bill Laswell albums
Albums produced by Bill Laswell
Sub Rosa Records albums